The 2007 Arkansas Razorbacks football team represented the University of Arkansas in the 2007 NCAA Division I FBS football season. The Razorbacks played six home games at Donald W. Reynolds Razorback Stadium in Fayetteville, Arkansas and two home games at War Memorial Stadium in Little Rock, Arkansas.

Running back Darren McFadden entered his name into the 2008 NFL Draft after the 2007 season. He left Arkansas holding most of the school's rushing records, to include rushing yards in a single game (321), a season (1,830), and a career (4,590). The single game total is also an SEC record. McFadden became only the second player in school history to rush for 1,000 yards in three consecutive seasons, along with former Hog Ben Cowins. McFadden also became the second player in SEC history with three straight 1,000 yard seasons, alongside Herschel Walker.

Pre-season

Ranking 

The 2007 Arkansas Razorbacks football team was selected in the top 25 in several pre-season polls.

Pre-season coaching changes 

 Due to plans for David Lee to be hired as its co-offensive coordinator, Gus Malzahn departed to Tulsa. Malzahn's departure led to Lee being named the sole offensive coordinator.
 Louis Campbell was previously the secondary coach, but was moved off the field after being named Assistant Athletic Director for Administrative Services.
 Alex Wood was previously the quarterbacks coach but was moved to wide receivers coach.
 Chris Vaughn was named the safeties coach and will continue his role as the Director of On-Campus Recruiting.
 Due to Danny Nutt's resignation as the running backs coach because of a recurrence of bleeding from his brain stem, the University of Arkansas has hired Tim Horton as its running backs coach.

Pre-season award watches 

 Jr. C Jonathan Luigs
 Rotary Lombardi Award
 Outland Trophy
 Jr. RB Darren McFadden
 Heisman Memorial Trophy Award
 Maxwell Award
 Doak Walker Award
 Walter Camp Award
 Jr. RB Felix Jones
 Maxwell Award
 Doak Walker Award
 Sr. WR Marcus Monk
 Maxwell Award
 Jr. P Jeremy Davis
 Ray Guy Award

Pre-season All-SEC Team

First Team 
 C Jonathan Luigs
 RB Darren McFadden
 RB/RS Felix Jones
 WR Marcus Monk

Season

Schedule

Post-season coaching changes 
 Head coach Houston Nutt resigned from his position on November 26, 2007. With Nutt's resignation, the Razorbacks' defensive coordinator Reggie Herring was named the interim head coach for the Razorbacks' bowl game.
 Due to Herring becoming the interim head coach, Louis Campbell coordinated the defense and Pierre Brown coached the linebackers in the Razorbacks' bowl game.
 On December 11, 2007, former Louisville Cardinals and Atlanta Falcons coach Bobby Petrino was introduced as the new coach. However, Petrino handled recruiting for the Razorbacks for the 2008 season and did not coach the bowl game.
 Chris Vaughn resigned from his position to head to Ole Miss. Because of this, Louis Campbell also coached the safeties in their bowl game.

Awards 
 Jr. C Jonathan Luigs
 Dave Rimington Trophy Winner
 Jr. RB Darren McFadden
 Doak Walker Award Winner
 Walter Camp Award Winner
 Heisman Memorial Trophy Award Runner-Up
 Maxwell Award Finalist
 Jr. RB Felix Jones
 Doak Walker Award Semifinalist
 Sr. FB Farod Jackson
 Vincent dePaul Draddy Trophy Semifinalist

All-SEC Team

First Team 
 C Jonathan Luigs
 OL Robert Felton
 RB Darren McFadden
 Kick Return Felix Jones

Second Team 
 OL Nate Garner
 OL Mitch Petrus
 DT Marcus Harrison 
 S Matt Hewitt 
 DB Michael Grant
 RB Felix Jones

Freshman Team 
 TE D.J. Williams
 DL Damario Ambrose
 LB Freddy Burton
 PK Alex Tejada

Cotton Bowl Classic 
On December 2, 2007, the Arkansas Razorbacks accepted the invitation to play in the Cotton Bowl Classic against the Missouri Tigers. Arkansas lost to Missouri, 38–7, and their all-time record in the Cotton Bowl Classic fell to 3–7–1.

Game summaries

Troy 
Last meeting: November 2, 2002, W 23–0

Alabama 
Last Meeting: September 23, 2006, W 24–23 (2OT)

Alabama built an early 21-point lead but had to mount a come-from-behind drive in the final two minutes of the game in order to capture a 41–38 victory.

Kentucky 
Last Meeting: November 1, 2003, W 71–63 (7 OT)

North Texas 
Last Meeting: September 20, 2003, W 31–7

Chattanooga 
Last Meeting: First Meeting

Auburn 
Last Meeting: October 7, 2006, W 27–10

Ole Miss 
Last Meeting: October 21, 2006, W 38–3

Florida International 
Last Meeting: First Meeting

South Carolina 
Last Meeting: November 4, 2006, W 26–20

Tennessee 
Last Meeting: November 11, 2006, W 31–14

Mississippi State 
Last Meeting: November 18, 2006, W 28–14

LSU 
Last Meeting: November 24, 2006, L 26–31

Missouri (Cotton Bowl Classic)Last Meeting: December 31, 2003, W 27–14

Rankings

Personnel

Roster

Coaching staff

References 

Arkansas
Arkansas Razorbacks football seasons
Arkansas Razorbacks football